The Isotta Brothers were notable Italian hoteliers in the second half of the nineteenth century.

Southern Italy

The Albergo di Ginevra (Geneva Hotel) was located in the center of the city of Naples facing the Medina fountain. 
It was a large building owner by the Passato family.
From 1861 to 1862 it was operated by Francesco Ferrari, then in October 1863 a company was formed to operate it jointly owned by Ferrari and the Isotta brothers.
Ferrari received a quarter of the profits.
The Isotta brothers, who had contributed most of the capital, took the rest.
The hotel became the most prestigious in the city.
As of 1862 the brothers had also acquired the Hotel Central opposite the Hotel de Geneve with apartments catering to families.
The holding company dissolved on 3 July 1867, and the Isotta brothers took full control of the hotel.
Ferrari received 168,300 lire for his share.

As of 1873 the brothers also operated the Hotel Vittoria in Caserta.
At that time the Isotta brothers ran the restaurant service in boats operated by G. B. Lavarello providing service to America.
In 1877 the brothers were operating the Hotel Quisisana in Castellamare in the Gulf of Naples, and the Hotel de Geneve, Hotel Central and Hotel de Rome in Naples. The Hotel de Rome was co-owned by Bruschetti.
In 1879 the brothers owned the Hotel de Geneva and Hotel Central in Naples and the Hotel Quissana in Castellamare.

Genoa

As of 1865 the brothers owned the Hotel de France and Hotel National in Genoa in addition to the Hotel de Geneve in Naples.
An 1868 guide described the Isottas' Hotel de France in Genoa as "clean, comfortable, and moderate" and the Hotel National in Genoa, also owned by the Isottas, as "convenient and good, with moderate prices.
The Grand Hotel Isotta opened on Via Roma, Genoa, in 1877, an exclusive hotel with many comforts and conveniences.
At the end of the 19th century the hotel was sold to Giuseppa Borgarello.
In 1879 in Genoa the brothers owned the first-class Grand Hotel Isotta, as well as the Hotel de France.
In 1887 they were still operating the Grand Hotel Isotta and the Hotel de France in Genoa.

References

Sources

 

Italian hoteliers
19th century in Italy